The 2018 ESPY Awards were presented at the 26th annual ESPY Awards show, held on July 18, 2018 at 5 PM Pacific at the Microsoft Theater in Los Angeles and on television nationwide in the United States on ABC at 8 PM Eastern/7 PM Central. On May 22, 2018, it was announced that Danica Patrick would host the event, which made her the first woman to have hosted the show.

Winners and nominees 
These were the nominees for each of the competitive awards. Fans were able to vote online at a dedicated ESPN site.

Honorary awards

Arthur Ashe Courage Award

 The 141 athletes who spoke out against former team doctor Larry Nassar about sexual abuse

Jimmy V Perseverance Award

 Jim Kelly

Pat Tillman Award for Service

 Jake Wood

Best Coach
 Aaron Feis, Scott Beigel and Chris Hixon – Coaches at Marjory Stoneman Douglas High School killed in the 2018 shooting

In Memoriam
British singer Jorja Smith performed "Goodbyes" during the performance.

 Roy Halladay
 Bobby Doerr
 Edwin Jackson
 Augie Garrido
 Jana Novotná
 Billy Cannon
 Rollie Massimino
 Earle Bruce
 Don Baylor
 Jo Jo White
 Tyler Hilinski
 Anne Donovan
 James Hylton
 Terry Glenn
 Rusty Staub
 Mike Slive
 Hal Greer
 Dwight Clark
 Y. A. Tittle
 Gene Michael 
 Connie Hawkins
 Jake LaMotta 
 Bill Nack 
 Keith Jackson
 Don Ohlmeyer
 Chameka Scott
 Bob Wolff
 Dan Gurney 
 Ray Emery 
 Bill Torrey
 Dick Enberg

References

External links
 http://www.espn.com/espys/

2018
ESPY
ESPY
ESPY
ESPY